Nepal will compete at the 2009 World Championships in Athletics from 15–23 August in Berlin.

Team selection

Results
While Chaudhari and Rimal both were entered in the competition, neither competed.

References

External links
Official competition website

Nations at the 2009 World Championships in Athletics
World Championships in Athletics
Nepal at the World Championships in Athletics